is a new  Japanese term applied to a string of consecutive holidays in September, occurring only in certain years. In 2009,  the term gained popularity, referring to the unusual occurrence that year of a weekend followed by three Japanese public holidays in September. The holidays were:
 Respect for the Aged Day, third Monday of September
 Autumnal Equinox Day, astronomically determined, but usually September 23
 Kokumin no kyūjitsu, the day in between the two other holidays
Japanese law stipulates that if there is only one non-holiday in between two public holidays, that day should become an additional holiday, known as a Kokumin no kyūjitsu (lit. Citizens' Holiday). It is unusual for September to get this extra holiday, so the presence of a "silver week" was not widely noted before 2009. The term "silver week" refers to an imagined second rank after the more famous "Golden Week". The holiday period is sometimes used for foreign travel. 

Prior to 2009, a different definition of Silver Week referred to the days in the second half of November around the time of Labour Thanksgiving Day, or during the first week of November by another source. Historians have identified Silver Week itself as a commercial invention of the 1950s film industry, keen to promote cinema attendance during the holiday by reference to the popularity of leisure pursuits during the better-established Golden Week, yet another invention of the Japanese film industry. However, this older definition of Silver Week did not catch on nor did it make it to some dictionaries.

September occurrences
The five-day break occurs in the following years:
 September 19 – September 23: 2009, 2015, 2026, 2037, 2043, 2054, 2071, 2099
 September 18 – September 22: 2032, 2049, 2060, 2077, 2088, 2094

See also
Holidays of Japan

References

Festivals in Japan
Public holidays in Japan
September observances